IROC XXII was the twenty-second season of the International Race of Champions, which started on February 13, 1998. The series used identically prepared Pontiac Firebird Trans Am race cars, and contested races at Daytona International Speedway1, California Speedway, Michigan International Speedway, and Indianapolis Motor Speedway. Mark Martin won $225,000 and the IROC championship, his third straight win and fourth in five seasons.

The roster of drivers and final points standings were as follows:

Race results

Daytona International Speedway, Race One
 Jeff Gordon
 Jeff Burton
 Mark Martin
 Dale Earnhardt
 Arie Luyendyk
 Dale Jarrett
 Terry Labonte
 Al Unser Jr.
 Tony Stewart
 Jimmy Vasser
 Randy LaJoie
 Tommy Kendall

California Speedway, Race Two
 Mark Martin
 Al Unser Jr.
 Jeff Gordon
 Terry Labonte
 Jeff Burton
 Randy LaJoie
 Tony Stewart
 Dale Jarrett
 Jimmy Vasser
 Dale Earnhardt
 Arie Luyendyk
 Tommy Kendall

Michigan International Speedway, Race Three
 Jeff Burton
 Mark Martin
 Tony Stewart
 Dale Earnhardt
 Tommy Kendall
 Terry Labonte
 Arie Luyendyk
 Jeff Gordon
 Randy LaJoie
 Dale Jarrett
 Jimmy Vasser
 Al Unser Jr.

Indianapolis Motor Speedway, Race Four
 Mark Martin
 Al Unser Jr.
 Jimmy Vasser
 Randy LaJoie
 Terry Labonte
 Tony Stewart
 Dale Jarrett
 Dale Earnhardt
 Jeff Gordon
 Tommy Kendall
 Arie Luyendyk
 Jeff Burton

This was the first appearance for IROC at Indianapolis. It was a support event for the Brickyard 400.
Mark Martin started last and won the race (the 5th time in IROC history that the winner started last).
This was Al Unser Jr.'s first appearance at the Indianapolis Motor Speedway since failing to qualify at the 1995 Indy 500.

Notes
 Race shortened to 30 laps due to rain.

References

International Race of Champions
1998 in American motorsport